Kramgoa låtar 19 is a 1991 Vikingarna studio album. For the album, the band was awarded a Grammis Award in the "Dansband of the Year" category.

Track listing
Höga berg djupa hav
Don't
Ett fång med röda rosor
Om vi var tillsammans
Sångerna får vingar
Vikingafest
Apache (instrumental)
Bara för en natt
Hallå hallå
Låt vindarna bära
Den gamla Moraklockan
När jag ser dig le
Håll mig hårt
Snart så går det åter mot ljusa tider
Samla alla vänner
Den första gång jag såg dig

Charts

References 

1991 albums
Vikingarna (band) albums
Swedish-language albums